Nanli Subdistrict  is a subdistrict situated in Xiangshan district, Huaibei, Anhui, China. , it administers the following nine residential neighborhoods:
Guiyuan Community
Dinglou Community
Lilou Community
Xueyuan Community
Meiyuan Community
Chengli Community
Shuguang Community
Kangle Community
Jinhuayuan Community

Shuguang, Kangle, Chengli, and Jinhuayuan were administered by Renmin Road Subdistrict before its abolishment in 2018.

See also
List of township-level divisions of Anhui

References

Township-level divisions of Anhui
Huaibei